Daryl Dimitri Smith (born May 8, 1963) is a former American football player who played as a defensive back in the National Football League (NFL) from 1985 to 1989. Born in Opelika, Alabama, he attended Opelika High School and the University of North Alabama before being selected by the Denver Broncos in the ninth round (249th overall) of the 1985 NFL Draft. He did not play in either of his first two seasons in the league, and by 1987, he had joined the Cincinnati Bengals. He played three times that season, all starts, logging an interception in each of his first two games. After a 30-day suspension for violation of the league's drug policy, he then played seven times in 1988, but did not start any of those games and did not record a statistic. He joined the Minnesota Vikings for the 1989 season, playing five times (one start), but again did not record any statistics. His brother, Brian also played in the NFL for the Los Angeles Rams from 1989 to 1990.

References

1963 births
Living people
People from Opelika, Alabama
Players of American football from Alabama
American football defensive backs
North Alabama Lions football players
Denver Broncos players
Cincinnati Bengals players
Minnesota Vikings players
National Football League replacement players